Banneville may refer to the following places in France:

Banneville-la-Campagne, a commune of Calvados
Banneville-sur-Ajon, a commune of Calvados